All Hallows’ Church is a Grade II* listed parish church in the Church of England in Ordsall, Nottinghamshire.

History
The church dates from the 14th century. It was restored in 1876 by Thomas Chambers Hine and 1880 by Charles Hodgson Fowler.

It is in a diocese with 
St. Nicholas' Church, Askham
All Saints' Church, Babworth
St Martin's Church, Bole
Our Lady and St Peter's Church, Bothamsall
St John the Baptist Church, Clarborough
All Saints' Church, Eaton
St Giles' Church, Elkesley
St Peter's Church, Gamston
St. Helen's Church, Grove
St Peter's Church, Hayton
St Martin's Church, North Leverton
St Peter and St Paul's Church, North Wheatley
St Martin's Church, Ranby
St Saviour's Church Retford
St Swithun's Church, East Retford
St Michael the Archangel's Church, Retford
All Saints' Church, South Leverton
St Peter and St Paul's Church, Sturton-le-Steeple
St Bartholomew's Church, Sutton-cum-Lound
St Paul's Church, West Drayton

Monuments
There is a kneeling monument to Samuel Bevercotes (d. 1603).

Organ
The church has a two manual pipe organ installed in 1877 by Brindley & Foster.

See also
Grade II* listed buildings in Nottinghamshire
Listed buildings in Ordsall, Nottinghamshire

References

14th-century church buildings in England
Church of England church buildings in Nottinghamshire
Grade I listed churches in Nottinghamshire
Retford